Calvary Radio Network is a network of Christian radio stations in the Midwestern United States, broadcasting Christian talk and teaching programs as well as contemporary Christian music. The network is based in Valparaiso, Indiana.

History
In 2008, Calvary Radio Network purchased 26 full powered stations, 27 translators, and one construction permit from CSN International. These stations were sold to Calvary Chapel Costa Mesa later that year. The network purchased 11 full powered stations and 20 translators back from Calvary Chapel Costa Mesa in 2010.

In 2021, Calvary Radio Network sold WCJL (90.9 FM) at Morgantown to the Educational Media Foundation for $250,000; it is now WBKC. WMJC, WVWG, and WTZI, were also sold in 2021 and 2022.

Stations
Calvary Radio Network is heard on 9 stations in Illinois, Indiana, and Wisconsin, as well as 8 translators.

Stations

Translators

Former Calvary Radio Network stations

References

External links
 

Christian radio stations in the United States
American radio networks
Radio broadcasting companies of the United States